John Dunlop (20 May 1910 – 10 March 1996) was a Unionist politician from Northern Ireland.

He was Member of Parliament for Mid Ulster from 1974 to 1983. Initially elected as a member of the Vanguard Progressive Unionist Party, from 1976 he represented the short-lived breakaway United Ulster Unionist Party.  Eisenhower Fellowships selected John Dunlop in 1989 to represent Northern Ireland. In 1982, he stood unsuccessfully for election to the Northern Ireland Assembly, achieving the lowest-ever vote for a sitting MP at a regional-level election.

References

External links 
 

1910 births
1996 deaths
Members of the Parliament of the United Kingdom for Mid Ulster
Members of the Northern Ireland Assembly 1973–1974
UK MPs 1974
UK MPs 1974–1979
UK MPs 1979–1983
United Ulster Unionist Party politicians
Vanguard Unionist Progressive Party politicians